Aurelia Marinescu (born 3 April 1954) is a Romanian rower. She competed in two events at the 1976 Summer Olympics.

References

External links
 

1954 births
Living people
Romanian female rowers
Olympic rowers of Romania
Rowers at the 1976 Summer Olympics
Sportspeople from Bucharest
World Rowing Championships medalists for Romania